The Grainger Engineering Library is a library at the University of Illinois at Urbana–Champaign College of Engineering for all disciplines of engineering at the University. It is situated on the north side of the Bardeen Quad on the engineering campus along Springfield Avenue. The Grainger Engineering Library is the largest library in the United States for the study of engineering. It is one of several "departmental" libraries that constitute the University of Illinois at Urbana–Champaign University Library.

History
The Grainger Engineering Library Information Center was designed to be a model for future academic libraries. This project was made possible by William Wallace Grainger, a University of Illinois electrical engineering graduate, class of 1919. Grainger made his fortune by launching a small, mail-order electrical supplies and components business that eventually grew into W. W. Grainger, a Fortune 500 industrial supply company that is named for the entrepreneur. Grainger felt a professional commitment to make technology accessible to everyone, and it was in that same spirit that his son, David Grainger, donated more than $18 million to fund the construction of the new library Information Center. In recognition to his contribution, a brass relief of Grainger was placed in the first floor lobby of the library.

The Grainger Engineering Library was dedicated on the 59th anniversary of the University of Illinois Foundation, October 14, 1994. The proceedings, entitled a "Gateway to a New Era", established the largest engineering library in the country, with over  holding more than 300,000 volumes. In keeping with the building's cutting edge technical advancements, the ribbon cutting ceremony was a purely digital affair. President Stanley Ikenberry, Chancellor Michael Aiken, and David Grainger, representing his father, William Wallace Grainger, pressed assigned areas on a computer touch screen to change a computerized red ribbon into a visual explosion of fireworks. In 1995 Grainger library took home the prize of Project of the Year as awarded by the Illinois Engineering Council. It also received the decoration of "Excellence in Masonry Design, Honorable Mention Award" from the Illinois/Indiana Masonry Council in 1996. It is widely accepted as one of the most technologically advanced information management centers in the nation with as many as 1,000 available computer hookups, at nearly every table, carrel, and desk.

Overview
The Grainger Library contains five different levels with the center area and a west area and east area. On the first floor center area there is the south main entrance, the north entrance, the main circulation desk, a computer area, a printing station, and in the fall of 2015, a coffee shop behind the elevators. The west area of the first floor contains quiet study spaces with desks for multiple people to work together, and the east area is mostly administration offices.

The second and third floors entirely quiet floors. On the second and third floor, the center area contains a two-story Main Reading Gallery, which can seat 1,254 people. The west and east area both have two sections, a one-story area on each floor and two-story reading galleries at the ends that can each accommodate approximately 100 people. The galleries are also used for special events and dinners. Books are mostly located on the third floor west and east areas, with some on the second floor east area. The second floor west area mostly contains study carrels.

The fourth floor contains the Center for Academic Resources in Engineering (CARE), which has tutors and exam study sessions for students to use. The east part of the center area contains an EWS (Engineering Workstation) computer lab with Windows-based computers, while the west part has collaboration tables and frosted glass that acts as whiteboards. There are two large rooms used for exam study sessions and staffed with tutors. The west area contains more collaboration tables and is surrounded with group study rooms which students can reserve online in advance. The east area is a quiet study carrel area.

The basement of Grainger is a quiet floor with large tables in the center area and west area. The east area contains a computer lab that is operated as a computer-based testing facility.

In addition, the facility contains three large seminar rooms (seating around 50 people) and four smaller conference rooms. When the building opened, it had 60 networked computers, 100 terminals, 7 information kiosks, and 6 servers. The building offers group study rooms, individual study carrels, faculty and scholar studies and conference rooms. In fact, it was so technically advanced that the furniture had to be custom designed because no one had ever had data and power connected to every seat on this scale before.

Computing and technologies
The Grainger Engineering Library Information Center provides computing facilities including:
Three computer and multi-media labs with over 100 engineering workstations, which are used for CAD, numerical analysis and modeling, and software development.
A digital imaging lab housing the Digital Library Initiative Projects, which provides access to 62,000 full-text journal articles; an information retrieval laboratory for visitors and researchers utilizing Grainger and campus resources.
Two instructional services labs, which serve as high-tech classrooms for information literacy instruction and presentations.

In addition, public-use terminals have been placed throughout the building that provide access to a statewide online catalog, Compendex, INSPEC, Aerospace Database, National Technical Information Service (NTIS), 1,000 full-text journals, and a wealth of local information resources. With more than 1.5 million people using the building in 2000, it is currently the second most visited study area on campus, second only to the Illini Union.

Social and financial resources
A big social resource that drove this project was the need for a new library for the engineering department. The College of Engineering had almost 5,000 students but the current library only had 120 seats and could only house 50,000 books. Grainger Engineering Library in a major improvement over the previous library. The Grainger Engineering Library Information Center opened to the public in March 1994. A $34 million multifunctional facility, Grainger Engineering Library was primarily funded by a gift of $18.7 million from the Grainger Foundation Inc., which is headquartered in Lake Forest, Illinois. An additional $11 million of State and gift funds was expended on the project for the rerouting of steam, electrical, and telecommunications lines, the demolition of several buildings, and the construction of the new Engineering Quad (which had been under consideration since at least 1926).

Design and construction

Design
The library was designed by noted Indiana architect Evans Woollen III and his firm, Woollen, Molzan and Partners, based in Indianapolis. Academic libraries were one of the firm's design specialties.

Safety and precautionary Steps
In building the library, the Construction Management and Design Team were asked to make estimates of the construction costs, the schedule of the project and the environmental impact on the surrounding areas. The environmental factors include, but were not limited to noise, dust, water and debris control. In addition, contractors needed to control the amount of pollution they were ejecting into the atmosphere. For that matter, the amount of dust and debris produced were controlled by requiring the contractors to provide proper dust control materials. The noise and dust risks were minimized through the use of muffled hammers and exhausts. The contractors were also required to control the surface water in order to minimize damage to the project and adjacent buildings. They needed to provide and operate hydraulic equipment of adequate capacity to control the surface water.

Issues affecting the cost and schedule
The construction of the library was interrupted when the university experienced a flood. The water flushed through the steam tunnels and eventually made its way to Grainger's basement. There was worry that the water's weight could have strained the building structural integrity but since the stress was spread so evenly, the building was not critically damaged. Nevertheless, the basement had to be redone and the project was delayed 3 months.

Also, the initial plan in the construction of Grainger did not include a north entrance. It was deemed as an expensive plan to have a second entrance because of the security risk. In addition to metal detectors and such, both doors must be worked during operating hours of the library. Even so, due to the number of request from faculties and students coming in from the north side, a second entrance was built.  Due to the above issues, the project was over budget and was behind schedule by approximately two months.

Personnel involved
There were 3 University clients involved: Capital Programs, Operation and Maintenance, and the Engineering school. The project was done with a construction manager, P.K. DeMars. In addition, there were 28 subcontractor contracts (not including the 20 or so for furniture). Some consultants hired on the project were an acoustician and a lighting specialist.
 Architect: Woollen, Molzan and Partners
 Structural Engineer: Lemessurier Consultants
 Mechanical – Electrical Engineer: Henneman, Raufeisen & Associates
 University's Project Manager: Tim Kerestes
 Lighting Specialist: Bill Lam

See also
Grainger College of Engineering

References

Library buildings completed in 1994
University and college academic libraries in the United States
Libraries in Illinois
University of Illinois Urbana-Champaign
Buildings and structures of the University of Illinois Urbana-Champaign
Libraries established in 1994
1994 establishments in Illinois
W. W. Grainger